Shamu was the stage name used for several captive performing orcas at SeaWorld as part of their theatrical Shamu show beginning in 1960s. The original Shamu died in 1971, but the name was trademarked by SeaWorld and has been given to different orcas throughout the years.

In March 2016, following the 2010 death of orca trainer Dawn Brancheau and subsequent public backlash from the 2013 documentary Blackfish, SeaWorld announced they would be ending their orca breeding program and phasing out their orca shows, instead opting to introduce, "new, inspiring, natural orca encounters rather than theatrical shows,…[focusing] on orca enrichment, exercise and overall health."

Original Shamu
In October 1965, a female juvenile orca was captured from the southern resident pod in Penn Cove, Puget Sound, Washington  by Ted Griffin. After living at the Seattle aquarium for two months, she was sold to SeaWorld San Diego in California. She became the park's flagship performing orca until April 1971 when she attacked Anne Eckis, a SeaWorld employee who was told to ride her as part of a filmed publicity event, and refused to release the woman until other workers came to the rescue. Shamu died four months later.

Shamu shows
Shamu shows have been presented at the following SeaWorld parks:
SeaWorld San Diego in California 
SeaWorld Ohio (closed in 2000)
SeaWorld Orlando in Florida
SeaWorld San Antonio in Texas

The orca performances have been held in SeaWorld's Shamu Stadium(s), which each seat 5,500, and all of the shows have involved a part where one or more whales splash the audience. The San Diego show has usually ended with a hangglider landing at or near the stadium.

Shamu shows throughout the years

Night shows performed during the spring and summer

SeaWorld Orlando & SeaWorld San Antonio present "Shamu Christmas Miracles" during "SeaWorld's Christmas Celebration", a yearly holiday event. SeaWorld San Diego presented "Shamu's Christmas" from the 2014–2016 season, when "Shamu Christmas Miracles" débuted at the park.

Shamu Educational Shows throughout the years

Baby Shamu
The first "Baby Shamu" was named Kalina. She was the first surviving orca born in captivity on September 26, 1985.  Ten orca calves had been born in captivity before 1985, but five were stillborn and the others all died within two months of their births. Kalina died on October 4th, 2010.  Kalina's parents, Katina and Winston, were bestowed the names Kandu VI (Katina) and Ramu III (Winston). The stage name "Grandbaby Shamu" was given to Kalina's first calf, which was born on February 2, 1993 – a male named Keet. The first "Great Grandbaby Shamu" was Keet's first calf, born on December 21, 2004 – a female named Kalia. Kalia gave birth to the first "Great Great Grandbaby Shamu" Amaya, on December 2, 2014. The father is Ulises. Amaya died on August 19th, 2021.

Show incidents
In April 1971, a 17-foot female orca, the original Shamu, bit and grasped the leg of 22-year-old Anette Eckis, requiring her to be rescued by trainers and taken to the hospital for stitches.
On February 23, 1984, a 7-year-old female orca by the name of Kandu V grabbed a SeaWorld San Diego trainer, Joanne Hay, and pinned her against a tank wall during a performance.
On March 4, 1987, 20-year-old SeaWorld San Diego trainer, Jonathan Smith, was grabbed by one of the park’s 6-ton killer whales. The orca dragged the trainer to the very bottom of the tank, hurting him, then carried him bleeding all the way back to the surface and then spat him out. Smith waved to the crowd when a second orca slammed on top of him. He continued to pretend he was unhurt as the whales repeatedly dragged him to the bottom of the stadium pool.  Smith was cut all around his torso, had a ruptured kidney and a six-inch laceration of his liver, yet he managed to escape the pool with his life. Later reports indicated that the whales involved in the attack were the 10-year-old female Kenau and the 9-year-old female Kandu V, who had previously attacked the trainer Joanne Hay in 1984.
In November 1987, Orky (II) was involved in an accident that injured trainer John Sillick during a show for the public.  Sillick was riding on the back of a female orca when Orky breached.  Sillick's back, leg, and pelvis were broken when Orky landed on top of him.  Sillick sued SeaWorld and received an out-of-court settlement, the details of which are under a gag order. According to Sillick's lawyer, after several operations Sillick can again walk, but his activity is limited.  Orky may have been responding to another trainer's (perceived) signal to breach.  Court documents are sealed but the judge's remarks, which were not sealed, revealed that Orky may have had "visual limitations" that had not been disclosed to the trainer. 
On June 12, 1999, 23-year-old Kasatka grabbed her trainer Ken Peters by the leg and attempted to throw him from the pool during a public show at SeaWorld San Diego.
In late July 2004, during a show at the SeaWorld park in San Antonio, Texas, a male orca named Kyuquot (nickname Ky) repeatedly jumped on top of his trainer, Steve Aibel, forcing him underwater and barred the trainer from escaping the water. After several minutes, the trainer was able to calm the animal, and he exited the pool unhurt. "Veterinarians believe the whale… felt threatened by the trainer, perhaps a result of the effects of adolescent hormones."
On April 4, 2005, SeaWorld Orlando trainer Sam Davis was repeatedly "bumped" by an 11-year-old male orca named Taku. The show continued uninterrupted, but the trainer was later taken to Sand Lake Hospital for unspecified minor injuries and released the same day. Additional eyewitness account: "The trainer and Taku were about to slide on the slide out at the end of the show when Taku completely stopped and started "bumping" the trainer. The trainer was male and he finally swam out of the tank. I knew something was wrong because none of the whales except Kalina wanted to perform. Then they finally got Taku out to splash people at the end of the show, when this incident took place."
On November 15, 2006, a SeaWorld San Diego trainer was injured when the park's 18-year-old female killer whale, Orkid, grabbed veteran trainer Brian Rokeach by the foot and pulled him to the bottom of the tank, refusing to release him for an extended period of time. Orkid released Rokeach only after heeding fellow trainer Kenneth Peters's repeated attempts to call the animal’s attention back to the stage. Rokeach suffered a torn ligament in his ankle but was not taken to the hospital. In response to the incident, SeaWorld increased the number of trainers who must be available during performances and in water training to five staff members, but this was ineffective because no more than two weeks later, trainer Kenneth Peters was involved in a similar incident with a different orca.
On November 29, 2006, Kasatka, one of SeaWorld San Diego's then seven orcas, grabbed her trainer, Ken Peters, by the foot and dragged him to the bottom of the tank twice during an evening show at Shamu Stadium. The senior trainer escaped only after staff members managed to separate the two with safety nets. This was the second documented incident of Kasatka attacking Peters; the first attack had occurred in 1999.
On February 24, 2010, toward the end of a "Dine with Shamu" show at SeaWorld Orlando, the orca "Tilikum" pulled down an experienced female trainer.  Dawn Brancheau, a 40-year-old with extensive training experience, drowned as at least two dozen tourists looked on from above a whale tank and from an underwater viewing area. Brancheau was finishing up a session with Tilikum, the largest orca in SeaWorld's collection, following the Dine with Shamu show. Following this accident, trainers no longer go into the water with the orcas at SeaWorld shows.

See also
 List of individual cetaceans

References

External links

Shamu.com – SeaWorld's official Shamu site
SeaWorld's "Believe" show page

Oceanaria in the United States
SeaWorld Orlando
SeaWorld San Antonio
SeaWorld San Diego